Algodonales is a city and a Municipality, located in the province of Cádiz, Spain. According to the 2002 census, the city has a population of 5,607 inhabitants. The nearest cities are Zahara de la Sierra and Olvera. Algodonales is located in the Sierra de Lijar within the Sierra de Grazalema.

Demographics
From:INE Archiv

Economy
Agriculture
Rural tourism
Adventure travel
guitar manufacturers

Monuments
Ermita de la Concepción. (hermitage)
Ermita de la Virgencita. (hermitage)
Iglesia Parroquial de Santa Ana. (church)

References

External links 

Ayuntamiento de Algodonales
Algodonales on Andalucia.com
Algodonales  on Turespaña
Algodonales on Cadiz Tourism

Municipalities of the Province of Cádiz